Merritt Dam is a dam in Cherry County, Nebraska, southwest of Valentine, in the north-central part of the state. The  earthen dam impounds the Snake River as it flows along the southern edge of the Samuel R. McKelvie National Forest in the Sandhills. It created Merritt Reservoir in 1964 as a project of the United States Bureau of Reclamation.

Merritt Reservoir State Recreation Area is adjacent to the eastern side of the reservoir and offers boating, fishing, camping, and hunting activities.

References

External links
 Merritt Reservoir State Recreation Area - Nebraska Game & Parks Commission

Dams in Nebraska
State parks of Nebraska
United States Bureau of Reclamation dams
Reservoirs in Nebraska
Bodies of water of Cherry County, Nebraska
Protected areas of Cherry County, Nebraska
Dams completed in 1964